Jonathan Richard Guy Greenwood (born 5 November 1971) is an English musician and composer. He is the lead guitarist and keyboardist of the alternative rock band Radiohead, and has written numerous film scores.

Along with his elder brother, the Radiohead bassist Colin, Greenwood attended Abingdon School in Abingdon near Oxford, England, where he met the future band members. The youngest of the group, Greenwood was the last to join, first playing keyboards and harmonica but soon becoming lead guitarist. He abandoned a degree in music when the band signed to Parlophone; their debut single, "Creep", (1992) was distinguished by Greenwood's aggressive guitar work. Radiohead have since achieved critical acclaim and sold over 30 million albums. Along with the other members of Radiohead, Greenwood was inducted into the Rock and Roll Hall of Fame in 2019.

Greenwood was named the 48th greatest guitarist of all time by Rolling Stone. A multi-instrumentalist, he also uses instruments including the bass guitar, piano, glockenspiel and drums, and is a prominent player of the ondes Martenot, an early electronic instrument. He uses electronic techniques such as programming, sampling and looping, and writes music software used by Radiohead. He described his role in the band as an arranger, helping to transform Thom Yorke's demos into finished songs. Radiohead albums feature Greenwood's string and brass arrangements, and he has composed for orchestras including the London Contemporary Orchestra and the BBC Concert Orchestra. He has collaborated several times with the Israeli composer Shye Ben Tzur, including on the 2015 album Junun. In 2021, Greenwood debuted a new band, the Smile, with Yorke and the drummer Tom Skinner.

Greenwood's first solo work, the soundtrack for the film Bodysong, was released in 2003. In 2007, he scored There Will Be Blood, the first of several collaborations with director Paul Thomas Anderson; in 2018, he was nominated for an Academy Award for his score for Anderson's Phantom Thread. He was nominated a second time for his score for The Power of the Dog (2021), directed by Jane Campion. Greenwood also scored We Need to Talk About Kevin (2011) and You Were Never Really Here (2017), both directed by Lynne Ramsay.

Early life
Jonny Greenwood was born on 5 November 1971 in Oxford, England. His brother, the Radiohead bassist Colin Greenwood, is two years older. His father served in the British Army as a bomb disposal expert. The Greenwood family has historical ties to the British Communist Party and the socialist Fabian Society.

When he was a child, Greenwood's family would listen to a small number of cassettes in their car, including Mozart's horn concertos, the musicals Flower Drum Song and My Fair Lady, and cover versions of Simon and Garfunkel songs. When the cassettes were not playing, Greenwood would listen to the noise of the engine and try to recall every detail of the music. He credited his older siblings with exposing him to rock bands such as the Beat and New Order. The first gig Greenwood attended was the Fall on their 1988 Frenz Experiment tour, which he found "overwhelming".

Greenwood's first instrument was a recorder given to him at age four or five. He took the instrument seriously, playing it into adulthood, and played baroque music in recorder groups as a teenager. He played the viola in the Thames Vale youth orchestra, which he described as a formative experience: "I'd been in school orchestras and never seen the point. But in Thames Vale I was suddenly with all these 18-year-olds who could actually play in tune. I remember thinking: 'Ah, that's what an orchestra is supposed to sound like!'" 

Greenwood spent time as a child programming computers, experimenting with BASIC and simple machine code to make computer games. According to Greenwood, "The closer I got to the bare bones of the computer, the more exciting I found it."

On a Friday 
The Greenwood brothers attended the independent boys' school Abingdon, where they formed a band, On a Friday, with the singer Thom Yorke, the guitarist Ed O'Brien and the drummer Philip Selway. Jonny had previously been in another band, Illiterate Hands, with Matt Hawksworth, Simon Newton, Ben Kendrick, Nigel Powell and Yorke's brother Andy Yorke. The youngest member of On a Friday, Greenwood was two school years below Yorke and Colin and the last to join. He first played harmonica and keyboards, but soon became the lead guitarist. 

As the band had fired their previous keyboardist for playing too loudly, Greenwood spent his first months playing with his keyboard turned off. No one in the band realised, and Yorke told him he added an "interesting texture". According to Greenwood, "I'd go home in the evening and work out how to actually play chords, and cautiously, over the next few months, I would start turning this keyboard up." Greenwood studied music at A Level, including chorale harmonisation.

Career

1991—1992: Pablo Honey and early success

In 1991, Greenwood was three weeks into a degree in music and psychology at Oxford Polytechnic when On a Friday signed a recording contract with EMI. He dropped out of university and On a Friday changed their name to Radiohead. The band found early success with their debut single, "Creep" (1992). According to Rolling Stone, "It was Greenwood's gnashing noise blasts that marked Radiohead as more than just another mopey band ... An early indicator of his crucial role in pushing his band forward." Greenwood played harmonica on Blind Mr. Jones's 1992 single "Crazy Jazz".

1995—1999: The Bends and OK Computer 
Greenwood wrote his first Radiohead string part for the middle eight of "My Iron Lung", which appeared on Radiohead's second album, The Bends (1995). On tour for The Bends, Greenwood damaged his hearing and wore protective ear shields for some performances. 

Radiohead's third album, OK Computer (1997), achieved acclaim, showcasing Greenwood's lead guitar work on songs such as "Paranoid Android". For "Climbing up the Walls", Greenwood wrote a part for 16 stringed instruments playing quarter tones apart, inspired by the Polish composer Krzysztof Penderecki.

For the 1998 film Velvet Goldmine, Greenwood formed Venus in Furs with Yorke, Suede's Bernard Butler, and Roxy Music's Andy Mackay and recorded covers of the Roxy Music songs "2HB", "Ladytron" and "Bitter-Sweet". Greenwood played harmonica on the tracks "Platform Blues" and "Billie" on Pavement's final album, Terror Twilight (1999).

2000: Kid A 
Radiohead's albums Kid A (2000) and Amnesiac (2001) marked a dramatic change in sound, incorporating influences from electronica, classical music, jazz and krautrock. Greenwood employed a modular synthesiser to build the drum machine rhythm of "Idioteque", and played ondes Martenot, an early electronic instrument similar to a theremin, on several tracks. 

For "How to Disappear Completely", Greenwood composed a string section by multitracking his ondes Martenot playing. According to Radiohead's producer, Nigel Godrich, when the string players saw Greenwood's score "they all just sort of burst into giggles, because they couldn't do what he'd written, because it was impossible—or impossible for them, anyway". The orchestra leader, John Lubbock, encouraged the musicians to experiment and work with Greenwood's "naive" ideas. Greenwood played guitar on Bryan Ferry's 2002 album Frantic.

2003—2005: Bodysong and first solo work 
In 2003, Greenwood released his first solo work, the soundtrack for the documentary film Bodysong. It incorporates guitar, jazz, and classical music. In 2004, Greenwood and Yorke contributed to the Band Aid 20 single "Do They Know It's Christmas?", produced by Godrich.

Greenwood's first work for orchestra, Smear, was premiered by the London Sinfonietta in March 2004. In May, Greenwood was appointed composer-in-residence to the BBC Concert Orchestra, for whom he wrote "Popcorn Superhet Receiver" (2005), which won the Radio 3 Listeners' Award at the 2006 BBC British Composer Awards. The piece was inspired by radio static and the elaborate, dissonant tone clusters of Penderecki's Threnody to the Victims of Hiroshima (1960). Greenwood wrote the piece by recording individual tones on viola, then manipulating and overdubbing them in Pro Tools. As part of his prize, Greenwood received £10,000 from the PRS Foundation towards a commission for a new orchestral work.

For the 2005 film Harry Potter and the Goblet of Fire, Greenwood appeared as part of the wizard rock band Weird Sisters with the Radiohead drummer Philip Selway, the Pulp members Jarvis Cocker and Steve Mackey, the electronica artist Jason Buckle and the Add N to (X) member Steven Claydon. At the 2005 Ether Festival, Greenwood and Yorke performed "Arpeggi" with the London Sinfonietta orchestra and the Arab Orchestra of Nazareth. It was released in a different arrangement on Radiohead's seventh album, In Rainbows (2007), retitled "Weird Fishes/Arpeggi".

2007: There Will Be Blood 
Greenwood composed the score for the 2007 film There Will Be Blood by the director Paul Thomas Anderson. The soundtrack won an award at the Critics' Choice Awards and the Best Film Score trophy in the Evening Standard British Film Awards for 2007. As it contains excerpts from "Popcorn Superhet Receiver", an earlier piece, it was ineligible for an Academy Award. Rolling Stone named There Will Be Blood the best film of the decade and described the score as "a sonic explosion that reinvented what film music could be". In 2016, the film composer Hans Zimmer said the score was the one that had most "stood out to him" in the past decade, describing it as "recklessly, crazily beautiful".

Greenwood curated a compilation album of reggae tracks, Jonny Greenwood Is the Controller, released by Trojan Records in March 2007. It features mostly 70s roots and dub tracks from artists including Lee "Scratch" Perry, Joe Gibbs, and Linval Thompson; the title references Thompson's track "Dread Are the Controller". In 2008, Greenwood wrote the title music for Adam Buxton's sketch show Meebox. He also collaborated with the Israeli rock musician Dudu Tasaa on the Hebrew-language single "What a Day".

2010—2013: Norwegian Wood and The King of Limbs 
In February 2010, Greenwood debuted a new composition, "Doghouse", at the BBC's Maida Vale Studios. Greenwood wrote the piece in hotels and dressing rooms while on tour with Radiohead. He expanded "Doghouse" into the score for the Japanese film Norwegian Wood, released later that year. Greenwood played guitar on Bryan Ferry's 2010 album Olympia. In 2011, he and Yorke collaborated with the rapper MF Doom on the track "Retarded Fren". 

Radiohead's eighth album, The King of Limbs (2011), was recorded using sampler software written by Greenwood. In 2011, Greenwood scored We Need to Talk About Kevin, directed by Lynne Ramsay, using instruments including a wire-strung harp. In 2012, he composed the score for Anderson's film The Master. That March, Greenwood and the Polish composer Krzysztof Penderecki, one of Greenwood's greatest influences, released an album comprising Penderecki's 1960s compositions Polymorphia and Threnody for the Victims of Hiroshima, Greenwood's "Popcorn Superhet Receiver", and a new work by Greenwood, "48 Responses to Polymorphia". 

In the same year, Greenwood accepted a three-month residency with the Australian Chamber Orchestra in Sydney and composed a new piece, "Water". Greenwood, Yorke, and other artists contributed music to The UK Gold, a 2013 documentary about tax avoidance in the UK. The soundtrack was released free in February 2015 through the online audio platform SoundCloud.

2014—2016: Inherent Vice, Junun and A Moon Shaped Pool 
Greenwood composed the soundtrack for the Paul Thomas Anderson film Inherent Vice (2014). It features a new version of an unreleased Radiohead song, "Spooks", performed by Greenwood and two members of Supergrass. In 2014, Greenwood performed with the London Contemporary Orchestra, performing selections from his soundtracks alongside new compositions.

In the same year, Greenwood performed with the Israeli composer Shye Ben Tzur and his band. Greenwood described Tzur's music as "quite celebratory, more like gospel music than anything—except that it's all done to a backing of Indian harmoniums and percussion". He said he would play a "supportive" rather than "solistic" role.

In 2015, Greenwood, Tzur and Godrich recorded an album, Junun, with Indian musicians at Mehrangarh Fort in Rajasthan, India. Greenwood insisted they hire only musicians from Rajasthan and only use string instruments native to the region. Ben Tzur wrote the songs, with Greenwood contributing guitar, bass, keyboards, ondes Martenot and programming. Whereas western music is based on harmonies and chord progressions, Greenwood wanted to use chords sparingly, and instead write using North Indian ragas. Greenwood and Godrich said they wanted to avoid the "obsession" with high fidelity in recording world music, and instead hoped to capture the "dirt" and "roughness" of music in India. The recording is the subject of a 2015 documentary, Junun, by Paul Thomas Anderson. 

Greenwood contributed string orchestration to Frank Ocean's 2016 albums Endless and Blonde. Radiohead's ninth album, A Moon Shaped Pool, was released in May 2016, featuring strings and choral vocals arranged by Greenwood and performed by the London Contemporary Orchestra. With Ben Tzur and the Indian ensemble, Greenwood supported Radiohead's 2018 Moon Shaped Pool tour under the name Junun.

2017—2016: Phantom Thread and The Power of the Dog 
Greenwood wrote the score for Anderson's 2017 film Phantom Thread. It was nominated for the Academy Award for Best Original Score and earned Greenwood his sixth Ivor Novello award. In the same year, he reunited with Ramsay to score her film You Were Never Really Here. At the 2019 BBC Proms in London, Greenwood debuted his composition "Horror Vacui" for solo violin and 68 string instruments.

Radiohead were inducted into the Rock and Roll Hall of Fame in March 2019. Greenwood did not attend the event; in the year before Radiohead became eligible for nomination, he told Rolling Stone: "I don't care. Maybe it's a cultural thing that I really don't understand ...  It's quite a self-regarding profession anyway. And anything that heightens that just makes me feel even more uncomfortable."

In September 2019, Greenwood launched a record label, Octatonic Records, to release contemporary classical music by soloists and small groups. He started the label to record the musicians he had met as a film composer. In 2021, he expressed uncertainty about releasing further Octatonic records, as the two they had released "seemed to not really connect with anybody".

For the soundtrack for The Power of the Dog (2021), Greenwood played the cello in the style of a banjo and recorded a piece for player piano controlled with the software Max. The soundtrack earned Greenwood his second nomination for the Academy Award for Best Original Score. For his soundtrack to Spencer (2021), Greenwood combined Baroque and jazz music, creating a conflict between the "rigid" and "colourful" styles. He also contributed cues to Anderson's 2021 film Licorice Pizza.

2021—present: the Smile 

In 2021, Greenwood debuted a new band, the Smile, with Yorke and the jazz drummer Tom Skinner. Greenwood said the project was a way for him and Yorke to work together during the COVID-19 lockdowns. The Smile made their surprise debut in a performance streamed by Glastonbury Festival on May 22, with Greenwood playing guitar and bass. 

The Guardian critic Alexis Petridis said the Smile "sound like a simultaneously more skeletal and knottier version of Radiohead", exploring more progressive rock influences with unusual time signatures, complex riffs and "hard-driving" motorik psychedelia. In May 2022, the Smile released their debut album, A Light for Attracting Attention, and began an international tour. Greenwood and Yorke contributed music to the sixth series of the television drama Peaky Blinders in 2022.

Musicianship

Guitar 
Greenwood is Radiohead's lead guitarist. He is known for his aggressive playing style; in the 1990s, he developed repetitive stress injury, necessitating a brace on his right arm, which he likened to "taping up your fingers before a boxing match". For most Radiohead songs, Greenwood has long used a Fender Telecaster Plus, a model of Telecaster that uses Lace Sensor pickups. According to Far Out, Greenwood used the Telecaster's "power and instability" to produce a "punchy" sound that helped set Radiohead apart in the 1990s.

On softer tracks, such as "Subterranean Homesick Alien" and "Let Down" from OK Computer and "You And Whose Army?" from Amnesiac, Greenwood plays a Fender Starcaster. He plays a Gibson Les Paul for solo performances and his work with the Smile. For bass, he plays a Fender Precision Bass, using an aggressive picking style. He sometimes plays with a violin bow. Greenwood said he dislikes the reputation of guitars as something to be "admired or worshipped", and instead sees them as a tool like a typewriter or a vacuum cleaner.

Greenwood often uses effect pedals, such as the Marshall ShredMaster distortion pedal used on many 90s Radiohead songs. For the "My Iron Lung" riff, he uses a DigiTech Whammy pedal to pitch-shift his guitar by one octave, creating a "glitchy, lo-fi" sound. On "Identikit" and several Smile songs, Greenwood uses a delay effect to create "angular" synchronised repeats. His main amplifiers are a Vox AC30 and a Fender 85.

In 2010, NME named Greenwood one of the greatest living guitarists. He was voted the seventh-greatest guitarist of all time in a 2010 poll of more than 30,000 BBC 6 Music listeners. In 2011, Rolling Stone ranked Greenwood the 48th-greatest guitarist of all time, and in 2012 Spin ranked him the 29th. In 2008, Greenwood's guitar solo in "Paranoid Android" was named the 34th-best guitar solo by Guitar World. "Paranoid Android", "Just" and "The Bends" appeared in NME's 2012 list of the best guitar solos.

Ondes Martenot 
Greenwood is a prominent player of the ondes Martenot, an early electronic instrument played by moving a ring along a wire, creating sounds similar to a theremin. He first used it on Radiohead's 2000 album Kid A, and it appears in Radiohead songs including "The National Anthem", "How to Disappear Completely" and "Where I End and You Begin".

Greenwood became interested in the ondes Martenot at the age of 15 after hearing Olivier Messiaen's Turangalîla Symphony. He said he was partly attracted to the instrument as he cannot sing: "I've always wanted to be able to play an instrument that was like singing, and there's nothing closer." As production of the ondes Martenot ceased in 1988, Greenwood had a replica created to take on tour with Radiohead in 2001 for fear of damaging his original model.

Other instruments 
Greenwood is a multi-instrumentalist and plays instruments including piano, synthesiser, viola, glockenspiel, harmonica, recorder, organ, banjo and harp. He said he enjoyed "struggling with instruments I can't really play", and that he enjoyed playing glockenspiel with Radiohead as much as he did guitar.

Greenwood created the rhythm for "Idioteque" (from Kid A) with a modular synthesiser and sampled the song's four-chord synthesiser phrase from "mild und leise", a computer music piece by Paul Lansky. He uses a Kaoss Pad to manipulate Yorke's vocals during performances of the Kid A song "Everything in its Right Place". In 2014, Greenwood wrote of his fascination with Indian instruments, particularly the tanpura, which he felt created uniquely complex "walls" of sounds.

Greenwood uses a "home-made sound machine" comprising small hammers striking objects including yoghurt cartons, tubs, bells, and tambourines. He has used found sounds, using a television and a transistor radio on "Climbing Up the Walls" (from OK Computer) and "The National Anthem" (from Kid A).

Software 
At the suggestion of Radiohead's producer, Nigel Godrich, Greenwood began using the music programming language Max. He said: "I got to reconnect properly with computers… I didn't have to use someone else's idea of what a delay, or a reverb, or a sequencer should do, or should sound like—I could start from the ground, and think in terms of sound and maths. It was like coming off the rails." Examples of Greenwood's use of Max include the processed piano on the Moon Shaped Pool track "Glass Eyes" and his signature "stutter" guitar effect used on tracks such as the 2003 single "Go to Sleep". He also used Max to write sampling software used to create Radiohead's eighth album, The King of Limbs.

Songwriting 
Greenwood's major writing contributions to Radiohead include "Just" (which Yorke described as "a competition by me and Jonny to get as many chords as possible into a song"); "My Iron Lung", co-written with Yorke, from The Bends (1995); "The Tourist" and the "rain down" bridge of "Paranoid Android" from OK Computer (1997); the vocal melody of "Kid A" from Kid A (2000); and the guitar melody of "A Wolf At The Door" from Hail To The Thief (2003), whose "sweet" quality inspired Yorke to sing the song's "angry" lyrics.   

The New York Times described Greenwood as "the guy who can take an abstract Thom Yorke notion and master the tools required to execute it in the real world". Greenwood described his role as arranger: It's not really about can I do my guitar part now, it's more ... What will serve this song best? How do we not mess up this really good song? Part of the problem is Thom will sit at the piano and play a song like "Pyramid Song" and we're going to record it and how do we not make it worse, how do we make it better than him just playing it by himself, which is already usually quite great.For his film soundtracks, Greenwood attempts to keep the instrumentation contemporary to the period of the story. For example, he recorded the Norwegian Wood soundtrack using a 1960s Japanese nylon-strung guitar and recorded it with period home recording equipment, attempting to create a recording that one of the characters might have made.

Many of Greenwood's compositions are microtonal. He often uses modes of limited transposition, particularly the octatonic scale, saying: "I like to know what I can’t do and then work inside that."

Influences 
Greenwood has cited influences from genres including jazz, classical, rock, reggae, hip-hop, and electronic music. His jazz favourites include Lee Morgan, Alice Coltrane and Miles Davis. Along with the other members of Radiohead, he admires Scott Walker and the Krautrock band Can. Greenwood said the guitarist that had most influenced him was John McGeoch of Magazine, and that Magazine's songwriting "informs so much of what [Radiohead] do". He declined an offer to fill in for McGeoch, who died in 2004, during Magazine's 2009 reunion tour. According to the Radiohead collaborator Adam Buxton, Jonny was "overwhelmed" and too shy to accept the role.

Greenwood first heard Olivier Messiaen's Turangalîla Symphony at the age of 15 and became "round-the-bend-obsessed with it". Messiaen was Greenwood's "first connection" to classical music, and remains an influence; he said: "He was still alive when I was 15, and for whatever reason I felt I could equate him with my other favourite bands – there was no big posthumous reputation to put me off. So I'm still very fond of writing things in the same modes of limited transposition that he used."

Greenwood is an admirer of the Polish composer Krzysztof Penderecki, and cited a concert of Penderecki's music in the early 90s as a "conversion experience".  He is also a fan of the composers György Ligeti, Henri Dutilleux, and Steve Reich. He has performed Reich's 1987 guitar composition Electric Counterpoint and recorded a version for Reich's 2014 album Radio Rewrite.

Personal life
Greenwood is married to the Israeli visual artist Sharona Katan, whom he met in 1993 when Radiohead performed in Israel. Her work (credited as Shin Katan) appears on the covers of Junun and Greenwood's soundtracks for Bodysong, There Will Be Blood, Norwegian Wood, The Master, Inherent Vice, and Phantom Thread. Their first son was born in 2002; Radiohead's 2003 album Hail to the Thief was dedicated to him. Their daughter was born in 2005, and a second son was born in February 2008. Katan said she considers their family Jewish: "Our kids are raised as Jews, we have a mezuzah in our house, we sometimes have Shabbos dinners, we celebrate Jewish holidays. The kids don’t eat pork. It's important to me to keep this stuff."

In February 2021, Greenwood appeared on the BBC Radio 4 program Saturday Live, where his selected "Inheritance Tracks" were "Sweetheart Contract" by Magazine and "Brotherhood of Man" by Oscar Peterson and Clark Terry. Greenwood is red-green colour blind.

Discography

Collaborations

Soundtracks

Compilations

Extended plays

Appearances 

 2009 – Dudu Tassa – "Eize Yom"
 2016 – Frank Ocean, Endless – string arrangement
 2016 – Frank Ocean, Blonde –  string arrangement
 2021 – Licorice Pizza (Official Motion Picture Soundtrack) – "Licorice Pizza"

Concert works
2004 – smear for two ondes Martenots and chamber ensemble of nine players
2004 – Piano for Children for piano and orchestra (withdrawn)
2005 – Popcorn Superhet Receiver for string orchestra
2007 – There Will Be Blood live film version
2010 – Doghouse for string trio and orchestra
2011 – Suite from 'Noruwei no Mori' (Norwegian Wood) for orchestra
2011 – 48 Responses to Polymorphia for 48 solo strings, all doubling optional pacay bean shakers
2012 – Suite from 'There Will Be Blood''' for string orchestra
2014 – Water for two flutes, upright piano, chamber organ, two tanpura & string orchestra
2015 – 88 (No 1) for solo piano
2018 – Three Miniatures from 'Water' for violin, piano, 2 tampuras, and cello/bass drone
2019 – Horror vacui'' for solo violin and 68 strings

Awards and nominations

See also
 List of Old Abingdonians

References

Notes

Citations

External links

 
 
 StringsReunited.com, a website by Plank, the guitar technician for Radiohead
 Greenwood's composer page on the Faber Music website

1971 births
Alternative rock guitarists
Alternative rock pianists
British male pianists
English film score composers
English male film score composers
English male guitarists
English multi-instrumentalists
English rock guitarists
English rock keyboardists
Grammy Award winners
Ivor Novello Award winners
Lead guitarists
Living people
Nonesuch Records artists
Ondists
People educated at Abingdon School
Musicians from Oxford
Radiohead members
The Smile (band) members